Joe Copcutt (born 2 August 1988 from London, England) is an English metal bassist. He is a founding member of Zoax and bassist of AxeWound.

Early life and career 
Copcutt was born in Islington, London, England. Copcutt's musical career began when he joined 12 Ton Method in 2006 around the time of leaving the band in 2008 he joined Rise to Remain replacing Theo Tan. Copcutt left Rise to Remain in 2012 along with Pat Lundy. In that same year he joined AxeWound. In 2013 Copcutt formed a new London based band named Zoax with Adam Carroll, Dan Prasad, Doug Wotherspoon & Jon Rogers. In 2018 he joined Carroll in the newly formed The Gore Club.

Personal life
Copcutt is a vegan, he is also a fan of Arsenal F.C.

Discography

12 Ton Method
 2008: The Art of Not Falling EP

Rise to Remain
 2008: Becoming One EP
 2010: Bridges Will Burn EP
 2011: City of Vultures

AxeWound
 2012: Vultures

ZOAX
 2014: XIII EP
 2015: Is Everybody Listening? EP
 2016: Zoax

References

External links
 

Musicians from London
English rock bass guitarists
Male bass guitarists
People from Islington (district)
1988 births
Living people
21st-century English bass guitarists
21st-century British male musicians
AxeWound members